Thescelosaurinae is a subfamily of thescelosaurid dinosaurs from the Early Cretaceous of Asia and the Late Cretaceous of North America.

Distribution
The distribution of Thescelosaurinae is quite large. They are widespread through United States and Canada where most of their fossils have been found. They also have a small group in North-Eastern China and Mongolia.

Genera

Studies disagree about which genera are included in the Thescelosaurinae. The group is defined to include Parksosaurus and Thescelosaurus and a cladistic analysis by C.M. Brown in 2013 concluded that the genera Changchunsaurus, Haya, Jeholosaurus and possibly Koreanosaurus are also thescelosaurines.

Classification

All thescelosaurines  were originally included in the family Hypsilophodontidae, which is presently considered polyphyletic (unnatural). They are all now considered to be basal neornithischians, though more research is needed to be certain. They are the sister taxa to Orodrominae, a group containing Albertadromeus, Orodromeus, Oryctodromeus and Zephyrosaurus. Their parent taxon is Thescelosauridae along with Orodrominae. Currently, all genera originally included in Jeholosauridae are classified in Thescelosaurinae, possibly as a group inside it. If the group of jeholosaurids is not considered natural than that might mean Jeholosauridae is a synonym of Thescelosaurinae. Recently, a phylogenetic analysis found them outside of Ornithopoda, the group they'd been allied with traditionally.

References

Cretaceous dinosaurs
Taxa named by Charles Mortram Sternberg
Ornithischians